Archibald Beaton Gillis (January 28, 1864 – January 18, 1940) was a farmer and political figure in Saskatchewan, Canada. He represented Whitewood in the Legislative Assembly of the Northwest Territories from 1894 to 1904 as a Liberal-Conservative, and Whitewood (and then Pipestone) in the Legislative Assembly of Saskatchewan from 1905 to 1912 as a Provincial Rights (Conservative) member. Gillis sat for Saskatchewan division in the Senate of Canada from 1921 to 1940.

He was born in Whycocomagh, Nova Scotia, the son of Donald Gillis, a native of Scotland. Gillis came to Saskatchewan, then part of the Northwest Territories, in 1880. He was postmaster at Whitewood from 1893 to 1908. He was also president of the Whitewood Trading Company and head of the Whitewood Implement Company. Gillis was Speaker of the Legislative Assembly of the Northwest Territories from 1901 to 1905.  He served as lieutenant-colonel in the 217th Battalion, Canadian Expeditionary Force during World War I. In 1914, Gillis married Margaret Lamont. He died in office at the age of 75.

References 

Conservative Party of Canada (1867–1942) senators
Canadian senators from Saskatchewan
Saskatchewan Provincial Rights Party MLAs
Northwest Territories Liberal-Conservative Party MLAs
Speakers of the Legislative Assembly of the Northwest Territories
1864 births
1940 deaths
People from Whitewood, Saskatchewan
People from Inverness County, Nova Scotia